Las Khorey is a historic coastal town in the Sanaag region of Somaliland.

History

The Las Khorey settlement is several centuries old. Between the town and El Ayo lies Karinhegane, a site containing numerous cave paintings of both real and mythical animals. Each painting has an inscription below it, which collectively have been estimated to be around 2,500 years old. Around  from Las Khorey is found Gelweita, another key rock art site. Karinhegane's rock art is in the same distinctive Ethiopian-Arabian style as the Laas Gaal cave paintings.

Somaliland in general is home to numerous such archaeological sites, with similar edifices found at Haylan, Qa’ableh, Qombo'ul and El Ayo. However, many of these old structures have yet to be properly explored, a process which would help shed further light on local history and facilitate their preservation for posterity.

Former president Ahmed Mohamed Mohamoud (Siilaanyo) visited the town in March 2014 along with a delegation including then Minister of Health Suleiman Haglotosiye. The restoration of Las Khorey's industries, among them its famous tuna factory, as well as the planned construction of a hospital for the town was announced during the visit.

Transportation

Las Khorey has a jetty-class seaport, the Port of Las Khorey. Horn Relief (now Adeso), an organization founded by Somali environmentalist Fatima Jibrell, began a project for the redevelopment of the 400-year-old seaport. The initiative was later taken up by Faisal Hawar, CEO of the Maakhir Resource Company. In 2012, he brokered an agreement with a Greek investment firm for the development of the commercial Las Khorey Port. A team of engineers was subsequently enlisted by the Puntland authorities to assess the ongoing renovations taking place at the seaport. According to the Minister of Ports, Saeed Mohamed Ragge, the Puntland government intends to launch more such development projects in Las Khorey.

The nearest airport to Las Khorey is the Bender Qassim International Airport in Bosaso.

Demographics
Las Khorey has a population of around 2,000 inhabitants. The broader Las Khorey area has a total population of 34,724 residents.

Economy
Las Khorey has long been an exporter of livestock, fish, produce, and frankincense. On the other hand, they imported rice, wheat, sugar, clothing, etc.

Canned tuna is well known and "Las Qoray" is accepted as like a trademark. In 1970, the Somali government built a fish cannery with a pier for fishing boats, and it became a major industry in Las Khorey. In addition to tuna, shark fins are also taken for export.

The factory, which had been shut down due to the Somali civil war, reopened in 2001, but was closed shortly after. The facility was modernized and reopened in 2007. At that time, there were 2,800 fishermen and factory workers. On August 12, Hodman Trading Company, a company in Dubai, United Arab Emirates, acquired the entire plant of Las Khorey. In 2012, it was reported that they were exporting to Yemen and the United Arab Emirates. In 2019, the BBC reports that fakes are on the market. Las Khorey's cannery will remain shut down as of April 2021.

Notable residents
Farah Mohamed Jama Awl, author

Notes

References

Laasqoray, Somalia

Populated places in Sanaag
Cities in Somaliland
Archaeological sites in Somaliland